Hedrum Church is a medieval stone church dating from  1100 in Hedrum, Norway. It is built of stone and can accommodate 300 people. As a medieval building, it automatically has protected cultural heritage status.

History
Hedrum Church is named in the Borgarting Christian law code (kristenrett), written  1080. It was one of six "county churches" (fylkeskirke) in the area around the Oslo Fjord. Before the dioceses were created, the clergy of the county churches were appointed by the king. A church may have been built in Hedrum in 1060, probably a wooden church. A celebration of the 950th anniversary of the stone church, which was built  1100, was held in 2010.

Building
The church has a rectangular nave, a square chancel, and a semicircular apse. Archaeological studies of the structure indicate that the apse was built later. The arch leading to the apse has the same configuration as the arch to the chancel, suggesting that they may have been created at the same time. It is therefore assumed that an older wooden church stood east of the chancel and was later replaced with the apse.

The church underwent restoration in the 1920s. At that time, the exterior plaster was removed so that the stonework was exposed, and the sacristy was built on the north side of the chancel.

Inventory

The altar was given to the church by Peder Tøgersen and Hilvig Mickelsdatter in 1664. There are two female figures carved on either side of inner part of the pediment; the one on the left represents Temperance, and the one on the right Wisdom. They are flanked by Saint Peter holding a key and Saint John holding a chalice. The painting in the center shows the resurrection.

There are many gravestones with coats of arms covering large parts of the floor in the church. The church's gravestones are registered with the Genealogy Society of Norway (DIS-Norge, Slekt og Data).

There is an Iron Age burial ground near the church.

References

Further reading
 Bjerke, Odd, ed. 2010. Hedrum kirke: 950-årsjubileum 2010. Larvik: Hedrum kirke. .
 Ekroll, Øystein, Morten Stige, & Jiri Havran. 2000. Kirkene i Norge, vol. 1: Middelalder i stein. Oslo: ARFO, pp. 92–95. .

External links
 Den norske kirke: Om Hedrum kirke
 Kirkesøk: Hedrum kirke
 Vestfold fylkeskommune: Hedrum kirke og gravfelt
 Heftet Vestfolds vakre middelalderkirker
 Kulturminnesøk: Hedrum kirkested

Stone churches in Norway
Churches in Vestfold og Telemark
12th-century churches in Norway